Enrico Fantini (born 27 February 1976) is an Italian footballer who plays as a forward for Cuneo.

Career
Born in Cuneo, Piedmont Fantini started his professional career with Piedmontese club Juventus F.C.

Venezia
In 1996 Fantini left for Venezia in co-ownership deal for 75 million lire (€38,734) In June 2000 Venezia acquired Fantini outright for 200 million lire, 125 million lire excess the original valuation.

In summer 2000 Fantini was sold to A.C. ChievoVerona, where he spent the second half of 1999–2000 Serie B. Fantini finished third with Chievo in 2000–01 Serie B. He was out of Chievo's Serie A plan and loaned to Modena. In June 2002 Fantini returned to Venice again. Fantini played for the league struggler until January 2004. Former Venezia owner Maurizio Zamparini brought most of the start players of the team out of the Lagunari in July 2002.

Fiorentina & Torino
Fantini won promotion to Serie A with Fiorentina in 2004. In 2005 Fantini left for new-born Torino F.C. of Serie B, which previous entity was bankrupted, and missed the Serie A promotion. He won promotion again at the end of 2005–06 Serie B. He was sold to Bologna F.C. 1909 for €500,000

Bologna & Modena
Fantini then spent 3 more seasons in two difference Serie B from 2006 to 2009.

Return to Piedmont
He returned to the region of Piedmont for Alessandria in 2009 for terminating his contract with Modena. In 2010, he returned to his hometown club Cuneo. he scored 31 goals in 32 games in 2010–11 Serie D.

Honours
Fiorentina
 Serie B Promotion Playoffs: 2003–04

Torino
 Serie B Promotion Playoffs: 2005–06

Cuneo
 Scudetto Dilettanti Group A winner: 2011

References

External links
 Football.it Profile 
 Cuneo Profile  
 Lega Serie B Profile 

Italian footballers
Juventus F.C. players
U.S. Cremonese players
Venezia F.C. players
U.S. Alessandria Calcio 1912 players
U.S. Livorno 1915 players
A.S. Cittadella players
A.C. ChievoVerona players
Modena F.C. players
ACF Fiorentina players
Torino F.C. players
Bologna F.C. 1909 players
A.C. Cuneo 1905 players
Serie A players
Serie B players
Serie C players
Serie D players
Association football forwards
People from Cuneo
1976 births
Living people
Footballers from Piedmont
Sportspeople from the Province of Cuneo